Dimitrios Miteloudis (born 11 February 1982) is a Greek water polo player who competed in the 2008 Summer Olympics.

References

1982 births
Living people
Greek male water polo players
Olympic water polo players of Greece
Water polo players at the 2008 Summer Olympics
Water polo players from Thessaloniki